Formlessness may refer to:

The lack of form
Chaos (cosmogony), the formless or void state preceding the creation of the universe in the Greek creation myths
Trailokya, world of formlessness, a noncorporeal realm populated with four heavens, possible rebirth destination for practitioners of the four formlessness stages
Arupadhatu (the world of formlessness) in Borobudur 
Tohu wa-bohu (redirect from Formless and void), Genesis before creation
Formless, book by Rosalind E. Krauss
Formless, the 2nd album from progressive metal band Aghora, released in December, 2006
Formlessness, album by The World Is a Beautiful Place & I Am No Longer Afraid to Die